The Serbian Army is the land-based and the largest component of the Serbian Armed Forces.

History

Originally established in 1830 as the Army of Principality of Serbia and after Serbia's independence it subsequently grew in size and was renamed the Royal Serbian Army. After the World War I it was incorporated into the newly established Royal Yugoslav Army which was in turn transformed into Yugoslav Ground Forces of the Yugoslav People's Army after the World War II. The Serbian Army in its current form has been active since 2006 when Serbia restored its independence.

Missions
The Serbian Army is responsible for defending the sovereignty and territorial integrity of Serbia from foreign hostiles; participating in peacekeeping operations; and providing humanitarian aid and disaster relief. 

The Army i.e. infantry battalions of its 2nd, 3rd and 4th brigades are tasked with securing the 384 kilometers long and 5 km wide Ground Safety Zone along the administrative line between Serbia and Kosovo with over 20 camps and security checkpoints.

Structure
The Serbian Army consists of six brigades, six independent battalions directly attached to the Army Command, as well as the Technical Overhauling Institute and Multinational Operations Training Centre. The four primary army brigades are composed of as many as ten battalions, including: one command battalion, one armored battalion, two mechanized battalions, two infantry battalions, one self-propelled artillery battalion, one self-propelled multiple rocket launcher artillery battalion, one air-defence battalion, one engineer battalion and one logistics battalion.

  Army Command
 3rd Military Police Battalion (Niš)
  5th Military Police Battalion (Belgrade)
  246th NBC Battalion (Kruševac)
  21st Signal Battalion (Niš)
 T–72M Tank Battalion (Niš)
 Armored Reconnaissance Battalion (Niš) 
 1st Brigade 
10th Command Battalion (Novi Sad)
11th Infantry Battalion (Pančevo)
12th Self-propelled Artillery Battalion (Bačka Topola)
13th Self-propelled Multiple Rocket Launcher Artillery Battalion (Sremska Mitrovica)
14th Air-defence Artillery Battalion (Pančevo)
15th Tank Battalion (Sremska Mitrovica)
16th Mechanized Battalion (Sremska Mitrovica)
17th Mechanized Battalion (Bačka Topola)
18th Engineer Battalion (Novi Sad)
19th Logistics Battalion (Novi Sad)
111th Infantry Battalion (Loznica)
 2nd Brigade 
20th Command Battalion (Kraljevo)
21st Infantry Battalion (Raška)
22nd Infantry Battalion (Požega)
23rd Self-propelled Artillery Battalion (Kraljevo)
24th Self-propelled Multiple Rocket Launcher Artillery Battalion (Valjevo)
25th Air-defence Artillery Battalion (Kraljevo)
26th Tank Battalion (Kraljevo)
27th Mechanized Battalion (Kraljevo)
28th Mechanized Battalion (Novi Pazar)
29th Logistics Battalion (Kraljevo)
210th Engineer Battalion (Kraljevo)
211th Mountain Battalion (Priboj, in process of formation)
 3rd Brigade 
30th Command Battalion (Niš)
31st Infantry Battalion (Zaječar)
32nd Infantry Battalion (Zaječar)
33rd Self-propelled Howitzer Artillery Battalion (Niš)
34th Multiple Rocket Launcher Artillery Battalion (Niš)
35th Air-defence Artillery Battalion (Niš)
36th Tank Battalion (Niš)
37th Mechanized Battalion (Kuršumlija)
38th Mechanized Battalion (Kuršumlija)
39th Logistics Battalion (Niš)
310th Engineer Battalion (Prokuplje)
 4th Brigade 
40th Command Battalion (Vranje)
41st Infantry Battalion (Bujanovac, Army Base "Jug")
42nd Infantry Battalion (Bujanovac, Army Base "Jug")
43rd Self-propelled Howitzer Artillery Battalion (Vranje)
44th Self-propelled Multiple Rocket Launcher Artillery Battalion (Leskovac)
45th Air-defence Artillery Battalion (Vranje)
46th Tank Battalion (Vranje)
47th Mechanized Battalion (Vranje)
48th Mechanized Battalion (Bujanovac, Army Base "Jug")
49th Logistics Battalion (Vranje)
410th Engineer Battalion (Vranje)

 Mixed Artillery Brigade 
 Command Battalion (Niš)
1st Howitzer-Cannon Artillery Battalion (Niš)
2nd Howitzer-Cannon Artillery Battalion (Niš)
3rd Cannon Artillery Battalion (Niš)
4th Cannon Artillery Battalion (Niš)
Self-propelled Howitzer-Cannon Artillery Battalion (Niš)
Mixed Missile Artillery Battalion (Niš)
69th Logistics Battalion (Niš)
 River Flotilla 
Command Company (Novi Sad)
1st River Detachment (Novi Sad)
2nd River Detachment (Belgrade)
1st Pontoon Battalion (Šabac)
2nd Pontoon Battalion (Novi Sad)
Logistics Company (Novi Sad)
 Multinational Operations Training Centre 
 Technical Overhauling Institute "Čačak"

Equipment

The following equipment is in operational use as of 2022:

Armored vehicles
M-84 main battle tank - 212
T-72B1MS main battle tank - 30
BVP M-80 infantry fighting vehicle - 320
Lazar armoured personnel carrier - 30 Lazar 3
BRDM-2 armoured reconnaissance vehicle - 66 (30 BRDM-2MS; 36 BRDM-2)
BOV KIV armoured reconnaissance vehicle - 10 
Miloš light armoured vehicle - 20
Humvee light armoured vehicle - 40
BOV M-86 light armoured vehicle - 51 (used by military police)

Artillery
Nora B-52 155mm self-propelled howitzer - 18
2S1 Gvozdika 122mm self-propelled howitzer - 72
Nora M-84 152mm howitzer - 36
M-87 Orkan 262mm self-propelled multiple rocket launcher - 4
M-77 Oganj 128mm self-propelled multiple rocket launcher - 60
M-94 Plamen-S 128mm self-propelled multiple rocket launcher - 18
M74/M75 120mm mortar

Anti-armour
BOV Polo M-83 tank destroyer (armed with 9M14T Malyutka missile)
9M14 Malyutka anti-tank missile system
9K111 Fagot anti-tank missile system
M80 Zolja anti-tank missile launcher
M79 Osa anti-tank missile launcher

Air-defence
PASARS-16 short-range surface-to-air missile system (armed with Mistral missiles) - 3 batteries
9K35 Strela-10 short-range surface-to-air missile system - 1 battery
9K31 Strela-1 short-range surface-to-air missile system - 9 batteries
Bofors L/70 anti-aircraft gun - 72
9K34 Strela-3 MANPADS
9K32 Strela-2 MANPADS

Vessels
Neštin class minesweeper - 4 
Type 20 Biscaya class river patrol craft - 3 
Type 22 441 class landing crafts - 5 
River patrol boats - 4 
Tanker - 1
Degaussing vessel - 1
RIB 720 rigid inflatable boat - 10

Firearms
Zastava CZ99 pistol
 Zastava M-19  assault rifle 
Zastava M21 assault rifle
Zastava M70 assault rifle
Zastava M84 machine gun
Zastava M72 light machine gun
Zastava M93 anti-material rifle
Zastava M91 sniper rifle

Ranks

Officers
The rank insignia of commissioned officers.

Enlisted
The rank insignia of non-commissioned officers and enlisted personnel.

See also 
 Royal Serbian Army
 Royal Yugoslav Army
 Yugoslav Ground Forces
 Ground Forces of Serbia and Montenegro

Notes

References

External links

 
 Official website of the Ministry of Defence of Serbia